Oluwaseun Oluwatosin Otukpe (born 5 December 1988) who goes by the stage name S.O. or Seun Otukpe in full, is a Nigerian Christian hip hop musician of British citizenship, currently based in Texas, United States. So It Begins was released independently in 2011. Lamp Mode Recordings released his second studio album So It Continues in 2012, and this album would be his breakthrough release on the Billboard charts.

Early life
S.O. was born Oluwaseun Oluwatosin Otukpe, in Nigeria on 5 December 1988. His family moved to London in the United Kingdom, when S.O. was nine years old.

Music career
S.O. started making music in 2010. He became signed to Lamp Mode Recordings in 2012, after they heard 2011's So It Begins. So It Continues was his second album, and this helped the artist to crack the Billboard charts. He is a featured on artist on the song "Get It Got It" that's on No Filter by Json. His third studio album, So It Ends, was released on 16 October 2015, from Lamp Mode Recordings, where it placed on two Billboard charts.  Since his last full-length album, S.O. has released multiple singles for digital download.

Discography

Studio albums

References

1988 births
Living people
Nigerian rappers
Rappers from London
Nigerian Christians
British performers of Christian hip hop music
Black British male rappers
Yoruba musicians
Nigerian emigrants to the United Kingdom
Rappers from Texas